This article contains records and statistics for the Adelaide Football Club (Adelaide Crows) who have played in the Australian rules football/AFL since 1991. The information on this article does not take into consideration games played against non-AFL teams.

This article is current to the 124th season of the elite Australian rules football competition. 31st season under the "Australian Football League".

Main sources of information: afltables.com  and afl.com.au

Adelaide Crows win–loss record

Active teams

Discontinued teams

Game records

Highest scores

*Note: GWS is Greater Western Sydney.

Lowest scores

Biggest wins

Biggest losses

Most points in a game

Least points in a game

Adelaide attendances

Attendances by season

Attendances by club

Attendances by venue

Highest crowds

Lowest crowds

Highest finals crowds

Lowest finals crowds

Adelaide coach records

*Note: The coach in bold is the current coach.

Adelaide venue records

Streaks

Consecutive games won

Consecutive games lost

Consecutive games scoring 100+

Consecutive games conceding 100+

Adelaide season summary

References

records and statistics
Adelaide Football Club
Adelaide Football Club